Stadion der Freundschaft is a multi-use stadium in Gera, Germany.  It is currently used for football and is the home stadium of 1. FC Gera 03. The stadium is able to hold 15,900 spectators and was built in 1954.

External links

World Stadiums entry

Freundschaft
Freundschaft
Athletics (track and field) venues in Germany
Buildings and structures in Gera
Sports venues in Thuringia